The Municipality of Alexandria was a local government area of Sydney, New South Wales, Australia. Originally part of the municipalities of Redfern from 1859 and Waterloo from 1860, the Borough of Alexandria was proclaimed on 27 August 1868. With an area of 4.2 square kilometres, it included the modern suburbs of Alexandria, Beaconsfield and parts of Eveleigh, St Peters and Erskineville. After a minor boundary change with the Municipality of Erskineville in 1908, the council was amalgamated with the City of Sydney, along with most of its neighbours, with the passing of the Local Government (Areas) Act 1948, although the former council area was later transferred in 1968–1982 and 1989–2004 to the South Sydney councils.

Council history and location

Early history of incorporation
The area that would constitute the municipality of Alexandria was first incorporated as the Waterloo Ward of the Municipality of Redfern in August 1859. Under the provisions of the Municipalities Act, 1858, 250 residents of the area including Alexandria signed a petition which was published in the Government Gazette on 17 January 1860, noting that "they have every reason for believing that their interests, as part of the said Municipality of Redfern, will be seriously injured by their incorporation with such Municipality, and are, therefore, desirous to be separated therefrom, and be and become a separate and distinct Municipality". The area was subsequently proclaimed as the Municipality of Waterloo on 16 May 1860 by Governor Sir William Denison.

Secession of Alexandria
In March 1868, a petition of 257 electors (including the first chairman of the Waterloo municipality, Edward Hawkesley) in the Western Ward of Waterloo was published in the Government Gazette arguing for the establishment of a "Borough of Alexandria", noting that "the rates received from the Western Ward have never been wholly expended in that Ward, and that no improvements of a permanent nature are in progress in the said Ward; nor has any sum been voted for that purpose during the past half-year [...] they believe that justice has not been done to them; nor can they hope that their interests will be consulted by the Council as at present constituted." The petition was subsequently accepted by the Government and the Governor Lord Belmore proclaimed the separation of the Borough of Alexandria and the reconstitution of Waterloo on 27 August 1868.

It was bounded by the Eveleigh railway yards and Boundary Street to the north, Botany Road in the east, Canal and Gardeners roads to the south and crossing through the suburbs of St Peters and Erskineville in the west. The first nine-member council was elected on 3 October 1868.

The first chairman of the Waterloo Municipality, Edward John Hawksley, was elected as the first mayor on 7 October 1868 and laid the foundation stone for the first Town Hall, built by local builder Thomas Shirley, on 8 December. However, Hawksley's term proved short-lived when the mayor of Waterloo, William Moon, disputed his election as an alderman for Alexandria in the Supreme Court. The case, based on electoral roll irregularities, was successful and Hawksley was disqualified from public office, leaving the council without a mayor until the election of Alderman Samuel Sparks on 7 January 1869. In a snap election called in February 1869 because of the vacancy, Hawksley was re-elected and was subsequently elected mayor once more.

Expansion and development
Over the next sixty years there were few alterations to municipal boundaries centred on the suburb of Alexandria. Rapid industrial and residential development occurred from the 1880s, with the population of the municipality  recorded as 7499 in 1705 dwellings by April 1891. It was this development that was noted in an 1887 profile of the municipality in The Sydney Morning Herald: 

The Alexandria Town Hall in Garden Street was designed and completed by Ferdinand Reuss Snr in 1881, with major alterations completed by architects D. T. Morrow and Gordon in 1928. In February 1883 a petition was submitted to the Government for the division of the borough into three wards. The division of the borough into East Ward, West Ward and South Ward was subsequently proclaimed on 22 June 1883. In January 1886, owing to the growth in population in the South Ward, a further petition was submitted for the division of the ward into two, adding "Beaconsfield Ward". This was accepted and proclaimed on 16 June 1886.

By 1891, the tramline along Botany road was constructed, the road itself the major thoroughfare in the municipality being laid out in 1821. From 28 December 1906, following the passing of the Local Government Act, 1906, the council was renamed as the "Municipality of Alexandria". By 1943, when the municipality celebrated 75 years of existence, Alexandria was the largest industrial district in Australia, and known as the "Birmingham of Australia", a term coined by the long-serving alderman and mayor of Alexandria, Michael O'Riordan.

Later history
By the end of the Second World War, the NSW Government had come to the conclusion that its ideas of infrastructure expansion could not be realised by the present system of the mostly-poor inner-city municipal councils and the Minister for Local Government, Joseph Cahill, passed a bill in 1948 that abolished a significant number of those councils. Under the Local Government (Areas) Act 1948, Alexandria Municipal Council was merged, along with most of its neighbours, with the larger neighbouring City of Sydney which was located to the North.

Mayors

References

External links

Former local government areas in Sydney
 
Sydney-related lists
1868 establishments in Australia
1948 disestablishments in Australia
Alexandria, New South Wales